Antenna Documentary Film Festival was established in 2011. It is an international documentary film festival held annually every October in Sydney, Australia. The festival was set up to promote documentary as an art form, with programming focusing on independent and innovative filmmaking that breaks new ground in the documentary landscape.

Films that have had their national or local premieres at Antenna include Minding the Gap, Aquarelle, Cameraperson, Grace Jones: Bloodlight and Bami, Web Junkie, Faces Places, Mr Gay Syria, 5 Broken Cameras, Leviathan and Virunga.

In addition to film screenings, the festival's program includes talks, masterclasses, and industry-focused events, offering a space for the documentary community to get together to network, learn and develop their filmmaking practices. The 9th Antenna Documentary Film Festival was held between 17 and 27 October 2019.

Awards 
 
Antenna have three competitive sections; Award for Best International Documentary, Award for Best Australian Documentary and Award for Best Australian Short Documentary.

Award for Best International Documentary

Award for Best Australian Documentary

Award for Best Australian Short Documentary

References 

Documentary film festivals in Australia
Film festivals in Sydney
Film festivals established in 2011
October events